Righteous Vendetta is an American metalcore band that originated in Cody, Wyoming.

Background
Righteous Vendetta was formed in 2008 at Northwest Community College in Powell, Wyoming by Ryan Hayes (vocals), Zach Paris (drums) and Derek Workman (Electric Guitar), all formerly of the band "Silent Awakening" in Cody, Wyoming. The band has played shows with acts such as P.O.D., Skillet, Red, and Taproot. The band was signed to Red Cord Records but are now signed with Another Century Records. The band has released three full-length albums and three EPs. The band's lineup from 2013 to 2016 was Ryan Hayes (vocals), Justin Olmstead (guitars), Carl Heiman (guitars), Riley Haynie (bass guitar), and Zack Goggins (drums), until Heiman departed from the band and was replaced by Justin Smith.

In March and April 2018, the ensemble toured with Lacey Sturm, Red and Messer.

Members
Current members
 Ryan Hayes – lead vocals, backing vocals (2008–present)
 Zack Goggins – drums, percussion (2013–present), guitars, bass (2021–present)

Past members
 Alex "Beaverdick" Beaverson (2008-2010)
 Matt Neddermeyer – bass guitar (2008–2013)
 Sam "Gary" Warshawsky – rhythm guitar (2008–2010)
 Isaiah "Dude" Perez (Phinehas, Love and Death) – drums (2008–2011)
 Carl Heiman – rhythm guitar (2010–2016)
 Zach Paris – drums, percussion (2011–2013)
 Justin Smith – rhythm guitar (2016–2019)
 Riley Haynie – bass guitar, samples (2013–2021)
 Justin Olmstead – lead guitar (2008–2021), rhythm guitar (2019–2021)

Timeline

Discography
Studio albums
 The Dawning (2010; Red Cord)
 Lawless (2011; Red Cord)
 The Fire Inside (2013; Independent)
 Not Dead Yet (A Rejected Record) (2015; Vendetta Records)
 Cursed (2017; Century Media Records)

EPs
 A Complexity of the Fallen (2009; independent)
 Righteous Vendetta Vol. 1 (2013; independent)
 Defiance (2014; Street Smart)

References

American Christian metal musical groups
Musical groups established in 2008
Rock music groups from Wyoming
Another Century Records artists
2008 establishments in Wyoming
Metalcore musical groups from Wyoming